Talim may refer to:

 Indian classical music instruction
 Typhoon Talim
 Talim Island
 Talim (Soulcalibur series)
 Talim (textiles)